The Madhya Pradesh Legislative Council was the upper house of the Legislature of the state of Madhya Pradesh, India from 1956 to 1969.  It was formed after the passage of the States Reorganisation Act, 1956 with 72 seats. This was later increased to 90 seats after the passage of the Legislative Councils Act, 1957. The Council was abrogated in 1969 by the passage of the Madhya Pradesh Legislative Council (Abolition) Act, 1969.

In 2019, there were demands for re-creation of the Legislative Council.

References

1956 establishments in Madhya Pradesh
1969 disestablishments in India
State upper houses in India